Torelló is a Spanish municipality in the comarca of Osona, in the Province of Barcelona, Catalonia. As of 2009 its population was 13,808.

History

Geography
The town is located at the confluence of the Ter and Ges Rivers. It is the main town of the Ges valley (Vall del Ges).

Demography

References

External links
 Government data pages 

Municipalities in Osona